Punchs Creek is a rural locality in the Toowoomba Region, Queensland, Australia. In the  Punchs Creek had a population of 43 people.

Geography
The creek Punch Creek enters the locality from the south (Stonehenge) and exits to the north (Tummaville).

History 
The locality is presumably named after the creek, which, in turn, was named after a horse in William John Castle's horse team.

In the  Punchs Creek had a population of 43 people.

References 

Toowoomba Region
Localities in Queensland